Evgeny Sergeevich Abramenko (tr. Yevgeniy Sergeyevich Abramenko; born February 26, 1987, in Vitebsk) is a retired Belarusian biathlete.

He competed in the 2010 Winter Olympics for Belarus. His best finish is 11th, as a member of the Belarusian relay team. His best individual performance is 40th, in the pursuit.

As of February 2013, his best performance at the Biathlon World Championships, is 6th, in the 2012 mixed relay. His best individual performance in a World Championships is 26th, in the 2011 individual. He won a gold medal in the 2007 World Junior Championships, in the individual.

As of February 2013, his best Biathlon World Cup finish is 5th, in the men's relay at Oberhof in 2008/09 . His best individual finish is 19th, achieved three times. His best overall finish in the Biathlon World Cup is 52nd, in 2010/11.

References 

1987 births
Biathletes at the 2010 Winter Olympics
Biathletes at the 2014 Winter Olympics
Belarusian male biathletes
Living people
Olympic biathletes of Belarus
Sportspeople from Vitebsk